Peacock Feathers is a 1925 American drama film directed by Svend Gade and written by James O. Spearing and Svend Gade. It is based on a 1924 novel of the same name by Temple Bailey. The film stars Jacqueline Logan, Cullen Landis, Ward Crane, George Fawcett, Emmett King, and Youcca Troubetzkoy. The film was released on October 18, 1925, by Universal Pictures.

Plot
As described in a film magazine reviews, Mimi Le Brun is introduced to Jerry Chandler by a cousin. He is asked to visit Mimi, and by the time he comes away he is in love. She refuses his proposal of marriage on the ground that he is too poor, and becomes engaged to a wealthy man whom she does not love. Jerry’s uncle George dies and leaves him a ranch and what is said to be a castle. He and Mimi elope, but when they see the shack that was called a castle, there is a bad time in view of their disillusionment. Mimi accepts the situation until the rejected wealthy man appears on the scene. She plans to run away with him, but when Jerry meets with an accident, she goes to him instead.

Cast

Preservation
With no prints of Peacock Feathers in any film archives, it is a lost film.

References

External links

Still at silentfilmstillarchive.com

1925 films
1920s English-language films
Silent American drama films
1925 drama films
Universal Pictures films
American silent feature films
American black-and-white films
Films directed by Svend Gade
1920s American films